was a Japanese sumo wrestler from Awazaki, Hitachi Province (now Inashiki, Ibaraki Prefecture). He was the sport's 7th yokozuna.

Early life and career
Born , his birth date is ambiguous. Although the date of 1802 is commonly accepted, some say he was born between 1795 or 1798. If the former is correct, he was the youngest yokozuna until the promotion of Umegatani Tōtarō II in 1903. The details of his younger days are unclear. He entered the Sadogatake stable in 1821, under the shikona, or ring name, . There, he began to wrestle for the Matsudaira clan, under which legendary sumo wrestler Raiden wrestled. Other sources state that he only started wrestling for the Matsudaira clan after he left his stable for the Nishikiyama stables.

In the top makuuchi division, he won 130 bouts and lost only 13 bouts, achieving a winning percentage of 90.9.

Retirement from sumo
After his retirement, he moved to Matsue but he returned to Tokyo in the Meiji period. He was known as a good calligrapher and a skilled writer, leaving behind him a lot of haiku. He died on March 29, 1877. His last words were "Lightning is passing away in the wind and the autumn sky". He was burried in the graveyard of the Myoen-ji temple in Shibuya, Tokyo. A bronze statue of Inazuma was erected in front of the Inashiki Municipal Museum of History and Folklore.

The sumo precepts
Inazuma is credited to have wrote the "Sumo Precepts" (sumo kun, 相撲訓), a combination of teachings related to sumo that warned rikishi against coarse behavior and taught them how to cultivate their fighting spirit. These precepts include notions like the cardinal values of Sumo (wisdom, humanity and courage) and disciplinary advices (wrestlers are not to indulge in the vices of alcohol and gambling). The "Sumo Precepts" also give advices to wrestlers when in bouts (do not show mercy to your opponent, do not underestimate him, do not fear him, do not scheme against him and follow your breathing while observing the moves).

Top division record 
The actual time the tournaments were held during the year in this period often varied.

  
    
    
  
  
    
    
  
  
    
    
  
  
    
    
  
  
    
    
  
  
    
    
  
  
    
    
  
  
    
    
  
  
    
    
  
  
    
    
  
  
    
    
  
  
    
    
  
  
    
    
  
  
    
    
  
  
    
    
  
  
    
    
  

*Championships for the best record in a tournament were not recognized or awarded before the 1909 summer tournament and the above unofficial championships are historically conferred. For more information see yūshō.

See also
Glossary of sumo terms
List of past sumo wrestlers
List of yokozuna

References

1802 births
1877 deaths
Japanese sumo wrestlers
Sumo people from Ibaraki Prefecture
Yokozuna
19th-century wrestlers